Club Deportivo Teguise is a football team based in Teguise, in the Canary Islands. Founded in 1949, it plays in the Preferente. Its stadium is Los Molinos with a capacity of 1,500 seats.

Season to season

7 seasons in Tercera División

External links
Official website

Football clubs in the Canary Islands
Sport in Lanzarote
Association football clubs established in 1949
Divisiones Regionales de Fútbol clubs
1949 establishments in Spain